3rd arrondissement may refer to:
France
3rd arrondissement of Lyon
3rd arrondissement of Marseille
3rd arrondissement of Paris
Benin
3rd arrondissement of Parakou
3rd arrondissement of Porto-Novo
3rd arrondissement of the Littoral Department

Arrondissement name disambiguation pages